José Escobar may refer to:

José Escobar (baseball) (born 1960), former Major League Baseball shortstop
José Escobar Saliente (1908–1994), Spanish comic writer and artist, creator of Zipi y Zape
José Bernardo Escobar (1797–1849), interim president of Guatemala
José F. Escobar (1954–2004), Colombian mathematician
José Gonzalo Escobar (1892–1969), officer in the Mexican Army
José Escobar (athlete), Ecuadorian javelin thrower
José Escobar (wrestler) (born 1975), Colombian wrestler